THRAK (King Crimson Live and Studio Recordings 1994–1997) is the fifth of the major box set releases from English progressive rock group King Crimson, released in 2015 by Discipline Global Mobile & Panegyric Records.

Based around the studio album THRAK (1995), the release expands on it with various mixes, alternate takes and live recordings.

The collection consists of 12 CDs, 2 Blu-ray discs, 1 DVD-A and 1 DVD. It is a limited edition which features both studio and live recordings by King Crimson's during the period of the mid-1990s line-up referred to as the double trio. It includes Jakko Jakszyk and Robert Fripp remixed reinterpretation of THRAK (1995), a set of improvisations known as "ATTAKcATHRAK", also Maximum VROOOM and the mini-album VROOOM (1994).

Track listing

Personnel
 Robert Fripp – guitar, Mellotron, soundscapes, vocals, production
 Adrian Belew – guitar, lead vocals, production
 Tony Levin – bass, extended-range bass, electric upright bass, funk fingers, Chapman Stick, backing vocals, production
 Trey Gunn – Chapman Stick, Warr guitar, backing vocals, production
 Bill Bruford – drums, production
 Pat Mastelotto – drums, custom percussion, production

References

External links 

 
 King Crimson – THRAK BOX (King Crimson Live and Studio Recordings 1994–1997) (2015)album credits & user reviews at ProgArchives.com

King Crimson albums
2015 albums
Discipline Global Mobile albums